Metabronemoides is a genus of parasitic nematodes, belonging to the family Cystidicolidae. Species of Metabronemoides are parasitic as adults in the gastrointestinal tract of fish.

Etymology
The generic name Metabronemoides (= Metabronema-like, resembling Metabronema) reflects the fact that the cephalic structure of these nematodes somewhat recalls that of species of Metabronema. Metabronemoides is a masculine gender.

Species
According to the World Register of Marine Species, the genus currently (2019) includes a single species:

 Metabronemoides mirabilis Moravec & Justine, 2010  
This species is a parasite of the stomach of the painted sweetlips Diagramma pictum (Haemulidae, Perciformes), a fish of the coral reef lagoon of New Caledonia. The name of the species mirabilis (= admirable, remarkable) relates to the fact that it has a remarkably different cephalic structure as compared to other representatives of Cystidicolidae.

References

Cystidicolidae
Parasites of fish
Secernentea genera
Parasitic nematodes of fish